The following lists events that happened during 2017 in Hungary.

Incumbents
President: János Áder
Prime Minister: Viktor Orbán
Speaker of the National Assembly: László Kövér

Events
 21 January – A bus carrying Hungarian students crashes near Verona in northern Italy with 16 people dead and 26 injured.
 7 February The town of Ásotthalom lead by László Toroczkai bans the Muslim call to prayer, and Muslim clothing,
 13 March – János Áder is elected head of state of Hungary for a second term by the National Assembly.
 May –  The World Congress of Families holds it 11th World Conferences in Budapest, Hungary with PM Viktor Orbán host.
 May – Former Leader of the British National Party Nick Griffin who was trying to emigrate, was banned from Hungary as he was perceived to be a "national security threat", according to security sources cited in the Hungarian weekly newspaper Magyar Narancs.
 13 June – The Hungarian Parliament Passes a Law Targeting Foreign-Funded NGOs. The law requires civil groups receiving foreign donations above a certain threshold to register as organizations funded from abroad.
 14 July–30 July – 2017 World Aquatics Championships are held in  Budapest
 7 August–20 August – 2017 FINA World Masters Championships in  Budapest

Deaths

 January 22 – József Torgyán, politician (b. 1932)
 February 5 – Kálmán Katona, politician (b. 1948)
 March 8 – George Andrew Olah, chemist, Nobel laureate (b. 1927)
 April 29 – Mátyás Usztics, actor (b. 1949)
 May 8 – Imre Földi, weightlifter (b. 1938)
 May 31 – István Szondy, modern pentathlete (b. 1925)
 July 11 – Éva Schubert, actress (b. 1931)
 August 30 – Károly Makk, film director and screenwriter (b. 1925)

See also
List of Hungarian films since 1990

References

 
2010s in Hungary
Years of the 21st century in Hungary
Hungary
Hungary